is a former Japanese football player.

Playing career
Karube was born in Chiba Prefecture on May 13, 1979. After graduating from Meiji University, he joined J2 League club Albirex Niigata in 2002. On December 8, he debuted as center back against Profesor Miyazaki in 2002 Emperor's Cup. On December 15, he also played next match in Emperor's Cup against Sanfrecce Hiroshima. However he could only play these 2 matches until 2003 and retired end of 2003 season.

Club statistics

References

External links
j-league

1979 births
Living people
Meiji University alumni
Association football people from Chiba Prefecture
Japanese footballers
J2 League players
Albirex Niigata players
Association football defenders